George Sayer was a teacher and biographer.

George Sayer may also refer to:
George Sayer (Royal Navy officer) (1773–1831)
George Sayer (MP) (c. 1655–1718), English courtier and politician
George Sayer (16th century MP), Member of Parliament (MP) for Colchester
George Sayer (priest) (died 1761), Archdeacon of Durham